Mogoy is a rural locality (a selo) in Khorinsky District, Republic of Buryatia, Russia. The population was 26 as of 2010. There is 1 street.

Geography 
Mogoy is located 107 km northwest of Khorinsk (the district's administrative centre) by road. Tokhoryukta is the nearest rural locality.

References 

Rural localities in Khorinsky District